Absolution is the third studio album by English rock band Muse, first released on 15 September 2003 through Taste Media. The album followed up on Origin of Symmetry diverse musical tendencies and elaborate sound, while also having a more focused and consistent theme and aesthetic throughout. Absolution has a noticeably darker and heavier tone musically, with a lyrical focus on theological and apocalyptic concepts.

The album reached number one on the UK Albums Chart. It also yielded the band's first top-ten single, with "Time Is Running Out" peaking at number 8 on the UK Singles Chart. In 2009, it was voted by Kerrang! as the second-best album of the 21st century thus far. As of 2018, Absolution has sold over 3.5 million copies worldwide.

Writing and composition
The band spent much of 2002 recording Absolution with producer Rich Costey. The album was recorded in studios in both Los Angeles and London. Bellamy said that the band made a "conscious decision" to "get together in a room and make music", setting aside time to record the album, as previous albums' recording sessions were 'hastily arranged' and rushed.

Absolution is an alternative rock, progressive rock, hard rock, and art rock album. It establishes some of the musical and lyrical themes which would later become Muse's trademarks, such as symphonic rock influences on "Butterflies and Hurricanes", orchestral music influences on "Blackout" and electronic music influences on "Endlessly". Lyrically, the album incorporates themes of fear, mistrust, personal achievement and joy, and a general theme of "things coming to an end". Bellamy said that the beginning of the Iraq War had an effect on their songwriting. These musical influences and lyrical themes were relatively new to Muse's sound and would be further explored on their following albums, in particular their fifth studio album The Resistance.

The B-side and bonus track "Fury" and future Black Holes and Revelations track "Soldier's Poem" were among discarded material written during the Absolution sessions, with "Fury" being dropped in favour of "The Small Print" due to Chris Wolstenholme and Dominic Howard's preference to the latter song, despite frontman Matt Bellamy intending to include the former on the album's track listing.

The track "Blackout" featured an 18-piece orchestra.

Title and artwork
In April 2004, Muse frontman Matt Bellamy stated "I think that absolution is not necessarily a religious word; it has meanings of purity, but it's not necessarily talking from a Christian or any particular religious point of view. I think it's just suggesting that the act of making music is a way of understanding things."

Absolution was one of two Muse albums (alongside Black Holes and Revelations) to feature artwork by Storm Thorgerson. The ambiguous falling/floating image was inspired by the René Magritte painting Golconda. According to Dominic Howard, "The artwork can either be seen as people coming down to Earth or leaving the Earth, it's open to interpretation". The special edition and vinyl pressing artworks slightly differ. The special edition features a different man in a different angle, while the vinyl pressing features a little girl, instead.

Release and promotion
Absolution was released on 23 September 2003 on CD and double vinyl. It was their first album released on the A&E Records label. There were six singles, of which the first, "Stockholm Syndrome", was download only. Because of contractual obligations, the band could not allow the song to be downloaded for free, so the fee was set at $0.99 and it was downloaded more than 20,000 times.

There was also a limited edition release of Absolution that featured a bonus DVD. This DVD contained 40 minutes of 'The making of Absolution' footage, as well as pictures of the band.

The album and each of the singles except "Stockholm Syndrome" were distributed as promotional CDs housed in Anti-Static Bags.

The song "Blackout" features in the 2006 film, Southland Tales and its soundtrack, Southland Tales: Music from the Motion Picture.

Critical reception

Absolution was met with positive reviews from critics, holding an average critic score of 72 out of 100 on Metacritic based on 16 reviews. Alternative Press wrote that the album's "chaotic choruses feel like the triumphant culmination of some earth-shattering undertaking", while Andrew Future of Drowned in Sound called it "a truly elemental opus". Tyler Fisher of Sputnikmusic hailed Absolution as Muse's most consistent album to date and felt that the album had perfected the sound of the band's previous releases, writing that it "expands on newer sounds and improves on others." Alexis Petridis of The Guardian wrote: "Muse sound like a band who are at the top of their game. Their confidence carries you through the album's excesses." Rob Kemp of Rolling Stone was less enthusiastic, drawing Radiohead comparisons but concluding that Matt Bellamy "doesn't bring as much ingenuity to his singing."

In 2005, Absolution was ranked number 345 in Rock Hard magazine's book The 500 Greatest Rock & Metal Albums of All Time. The album was placed in at No. 23 after a public vote for Q in February 2008 for the Best British Albums of All Time.

Legacy
Absolution was Muse's first album to chart in the US, and is credited with establishing the band a fan base in the country. It was technically the second Muse album to be released in the US, due to a creative dispute Muse had with Maverick Records, which prevented the release of Origin of Symmetry stateside. Absolution reached No. 1 on the Billboard Top Heatseekers chart and No. 107 on the Billboard 200. Absolution was certified gold by the RIAA in March 2007, becoming the group's first album to be certified in the US. The album also featured the band's first American hits – "Time Is Running Out" and "Hysteria", the former becoming their first UK Top 10 single and eventually went Gold in the US.

Track listing

Very early initial copies of the CD featured inlay errors, where the songs "Interlude" and "Hysteria" switched places on the track listing.
The bonus disc included with the Australian tour edition is entirely composed of live versions, recorded at The Big Day Out in Sydney, 23 January 2004 for Australian radio station Triple J and broadcast as part of the radio show "Live at the Wireless".

Personnel
Muse
Matthew Bellamy – lead vocals, lead and rhythm guitars, keyboards, programming, string arrangements, production
Christopher Wolstenholme  – bass, backing vocals, production
Dominic Howard – drums, programming, percussion, production

Production
Dennis Smith, Safta Jaffery – executive production
Rich Costey – production, mixing, engineering, additional production on "Blackout" and "Butterflies and Hurricanes"
Wally Gagel – engineering, digital engineering, additional production on "Butterflies and Hurricanes"
Paul Reeve – production and backing vocals on "Blackout" and "Butterflies and Hurricanes", vocal samples on "Intro"
John Cornfield – production and engineering on "Blackout" and "Butterflies and Hurricanes"
Roger Lian – digital editing
Howie Weinberg – mastering

Additional personnel
Audrey Riley – string arrangements
Spectrasonic's Symphony of Voices – vocal samples on "Stockholm Syndrome" and "Endlessly"
Storm Thorgerson, Dan Abbott – graphic design
Rupert Truman, Sean Winstanley – photography
Perou – band photography
Lee Baker – layout design
Sam Winston – typography

Charts

Weekly charts

Year-end charts

Certifications

Notes and references
Notes

References

External links
 

2003 albums
Albums produced by John Cornfield
Albums with cover art by Storm Thorgerson
East West Records albums
Muse (band) albums
Warner Records albums
Albums recorded at AIR Studios